Burak Demirboğa (born 7 June 1996) is a Turkish figure skater. He has won three senior international medals and is a six-time Turkish national champion (2018–23). He competed in the final segment at two European Championships (2018, 2020).

Personal life 
Demirboğa was born on 7 June 1996 in Kocaeli, Turkey. His older brother, Ali Demirboğa, has also competed in figure skating and contributes to his choreography.

Career

Early years and junior international career 
Demirboğa began learning to skate in 2002. His first junior international competition, the European Youth Olympic Festival, took place in February 2011 in Trabzon, Turkey. He debuted on the ISU Junior Grand Prix (JGP) series in September of the same year.

2015–2016 and 2016–2017 seasons 
Demirboğa's senior international debut came in December 2015 at the Santa Claus Cup in Hungary. He took bronze at the Turkish Championships. In January 2016, he won his first senior international medal – bronze at Skate Helena.

The following season, he became the Turkish national silver medalist.

2017–2018 season 
Demirboğa won the bronze medal at the Denkova-Staviski Cup in November 2017. In December, he won silver at the Istanbul Bosphorous Cup and then gold at the Turkish Championships; it was his first national title on the senior level. In January, he represented Turkey at his first ISU Championship – the 2018 European Championships in Moscow, Russia. He qualified to the free skate and finished 23rd overall. He was also named in Turkey's team to the 2018 World Championships in Milan, Italy.

Programs

Competitive highlights 
CS: Challenger Series; JGP: Junior Grand Prix

References

External links 
 

1996 births
Living people
Sportspeople from İzmit
Turkish male single skaters
Competitors at the 2017 Winter Universiade
Competitors at the 2019 Winter Universiade
20th-century Turkish people
21st-century Turkish people